"Klick" is the tenth and final episode of the second season of the AMC television series Better Call Saul, a spin-off series of Breaking Bad. The episode aired on April 18, 2016, on AMC in the United States. Outside of the United States, the episode premiered on streaming service Netflix in several countries.

Plot

Opening
In a flashback to 1999, Chuck McGill and Jimmy McGill have kept a vigil of several days at their mother’s hospital bed. Jimmy leaves to buy sandwiches and while he is gone, his mother wakes and calls his name twice before dying. After Jimmy returns, Chuck tells Jimmy their mother has died and falsely claims she had no last words.

Main story
Chuck is unconscious after hitting his head at the copy store. Jimmy rushes in to give first aid and tells the clerk to call an ambulance. In the hospital, Chuck wonders how Jimmy came to his aid so quickly, correctly deducing that Jimmy bribed the clerk to lie and then hid nearby to watch Chuck question the clerk. Ernesto covers for Jimmy by claiming that out of concern for Chuck's health, he called Jimmy before bringing Chuck to the copy store.

Jimmy refuses to have Chuck committed to psychiatric care but takes temporary guardianship and allows an MRI and a CAT scan to determine whether he suffered head or neck injuries. The doctor treating Chuck tells Jimmy that Chuck is healthy but has entered a self-induced catatonic state because of the medical tests. When Chuck returns to consciousness, Jimmy informs him of the test results and takes him home.

Mike Ehrmantraut purchases a rifle that he intends to use to kill Hector Salamanca. He positions himself on a ridge overlooking a desert site where Hector and his crew are preparing to execute Ximenez Lecerda, but Mike is unable to get a clear shot because Nacho Varga is in the way. Behind him, Mike hears his car horn blaring, so he leaves to investigate. He finds a branch wedged against the horn and a note on the windshield with a single word: "Don't."

Howard Hamlin tries to reach Jimmy and when Jimmy calls back Howard says Chuck is concerned that the mistakes he supposedly made on Mesa Verde's paperwork mean his judgment is no longer sound, so he intends to retire. Jimmy rushes to Chuck's house, where he finds that Chuck has plastered the walls with reflective space blankets, claiming he needs protection from ambient electromagnetic waves. Desperate for Chuck to stop behaving erratically, Jimmy confesses to tampering with the Mesa Verde documents and bribing the copy store clerk to keep quiet. When Jimmy leaves, Chuck unveils a tape recorder he had activated prior to Jimmy's arrival.

Production
Series co-creator Vince Gilligan revealed that he wanted to have Breaking Bad alum Betsy Brandt (Marie Schrader) make a cameo appearance in the episode, but the writer's room objected, considering the idea to be distracting for audiences.

Reception

Ratings
When first aired, the episode had 2.26 million viewers in the United States, and an 18–49 rating of 0.8.

Including DVR playback, the finale was watched by 4.78 million viewers.

Critical reception
The episode received acclaim from critics. It holds a perfect 100% positive rating with an average score of 9.16 out of 10 on the review aggregator Rotten Tomatoes. The critics' consensus reads: "Subtle but with detail-oriented precision, 'Klick' further scrutinizes the complex relationship between the brothers McGill while setting the stage for a potent next season." Bob Odenkirk received a nomination for Primetime Emmy Award for Outstanding Lead Actor in a Drama Series for his performance in this episode, while Phillip W. Palmer, Larry Benjamin, and Kevin Valentine were nominated for Outstanding Sound Mixing for a Comedy or Drama Series (One Hour).

Notes

References

External links
 "Klick" at AMC
 

Better Call Saul (season 2) episodes
Television episodes directed by Vince Gilligan
Television episodes written by Vince Gilligan